Giovanni Chiodi (born 25 April 1961) is an Italian politician. He was the Mayor of Teramo from 2004 to 2008. He has served as President of Abruzzo from 2009 to 2014.

Biography 
Chiodi graduated in Economy at the LUISS University and began his career as a chartered accountant.

In 1999, Chiodi entered politics as the Pole for Freedoms candidate for the seat of Mayor of Teramo, but loses against The Olive Tree candidate and incumbent Mayor Angelo Sperandio.

In 2004, Chiodi tries once again to run for Mayor of Teramo and wins, gaining the support of the whole House of Freedoms coalition; he left the office in December 2008, in order to run for the office of President of Abruzzo, winning the electoral competition.

In 2014, Chiodi tried to seek for a second term, but was defeated by the Democratic Party candidate Luciano D'Alfonso.

References 

1961 births
Living people
People from Teramo
Forza Italia politicians
The People of Freedom politicians
Presidents of Abruzzo
Mayors of Teramo
Identity and Action politicians
Libera Università Internazionale degli Studi Sociali Guido Carli alumni